The women's 100 metres hurdles at the 2016 European Athletics Championships took place at the Olympic Stadium on 6 and 7 July.

Records

Schedule

Results

Round 1

First 2 in each heat (Q) and the next 5 fastest (q) advance to the Semifinals.

Wind:Heat 1: +1.3 m/s, Heat 2: +1.8 m/s, Heat 3: +0.1 m/s, Heat 4: +0.6 m/s

Semifinals 

First 2 (Q) and next 2 fastest (q) qualify for the final.

Wind:Heat 1: +0.1 m/s, Heat 2: -1.1 m/s, Heat 3: -0.5 m/s

*Athletes who received a bye to the semifinals

Final 
Wind: -0.7 m/s

References

External links
 amsterdam2016.org, official championship site.

Hurdles 100 W
Sprint hurdles at the European Athletics Championships
2016 in women's athletics